The Fuller calculator, sometimes called Fuller's cylindrical slide rule, is a cylindrical slide rule with a helical main scale taking 50 turns around the cylinder. It was invented in 1878 by George Fuller, professor of engineering at Queen's University Belfast, and despite its size and price it remained on the market for nearly a century because it outperformed nearly all other slide rules.

As with other slide rules, the Fuller is limited to calculations based on multiplication and division with additional scales allowing for trigonometical and exponential functions. The mechanical calculators produced in the same era were generally restricted to addition and subtraction with only advanced versions, like the Arithmometer, able to multiply and divide. Even these advanced machines could not perform trigonometry or exponentiation and they were bigger, heavier and much more expensive than the Fuller. In the mid-twentieth century the handheld Curta mechanical calculator became available which also competed in convenience and price. However, for scientific calculations the Fuller remained viable until 1973 when it was made obsolete by the HP-35 handheld scientific electronic calculator.

Design

Model 1, the standard model

In essence, the calculator consists of three separate hollow cylindrical parts that can twist and slide over each other about a common axis without any tendency to slip. The following details describe the version made between 1921 and 1935. Both cylinders are covered in paper varnished with shellac. A brass tube with a mahogany cap at the top is a slide fit into the first cylinder.

A brass pointer with an engraved index marker at its tip (marked A) is attached to the handle so that it points to a place on the primary logarithmic scale, depending on the position to which the scale on cylinder C has been adjusted. A second brass pointer (marked B) is attached to the top cap pointing down over the logarithmic scale and it is positioned by rotating and sliding the cap at the top. This pointer has four index marks (marked B1, B2, B3, B4) such that whichever one is convenient may be used. Printed on the inner cylinder D are simply tables of data for reference purposes.

The calculator was sold in a hinged mahogany case  which, if required, holds the instrument when in use by means a brass support that can be latched to the outer end of the case. For all except the earliest instruments the last two digits of the date and a serial number, believed to be consecutively allocated, are stamped at the top of pointer B.

Other Fuller models
The calculator described above was called "Model No. 1" . Model 2 had scales on the inner cylinder for calculating logs and sines. The "Fuller-Bakewell" model 3 had two scales of angles printed on the inner cylinder to calculate cosine² and sinecosine for use by engineers and surveyors for tacheometry calculations. A smaller model with a  scale was available for a short time but very few survive. In about 1935 the brass tube was replaced by one of phenolic resin and in about 1945 the mahogany was replaced by Bakelite.

Included in Stanley's 1912 catalogue and continuing there until 1958 was Barnard's Coordinate calculator. It is very similar in construction to the Fuller instruments but its pointers have multiple indices so additional trigonometrical functions can be used. It cost slightly less than the Fuller-Bakewell and a 1919 example is held by the Science Museum, London. In 1962 the Whythe-Fuller complex number calculator was introduced. As well as being able to multiply and divide complex numbers it can convert between Cartesian and polar coordinates.

Comparison with other slide rules and contemporaneous calculators
The scale can always be read to four significant figures and often to five. In 1900 William Stanley, whose firm manufactured and sold scientific instruments including the Fuller calculator, described the slide rule as "possibly the highest refinement in this class of rules".

When it was introduced the Fuller calculator had a much greater precision than other slide rules although the Thacher instrument became available a couple of years later. This was made in the United States and was comparable in size and precision but radically different in design. However, these slide rules required some skill to operate accurately compared with mechanical calculators which manipulated exact numerical digits rather than using positioning and reading from a graduated scale. Mechanical calculators could only add and subtract (which the Fuller did not do at all) although models such as the Arithmometer could perform all four functions of elementary arithmetic. No mechanical calculators could calculate transcendental functions, which slide rules could be designed to do, and they were bigger, heavier and much more expensive than any slide rule, including the Fuller.

However, a revolutionary miniature mechanical calculator went on sale in the mid-twentieth century – while Curt Herzstark had been imprisoned in a Nazi concentration camp in World War II he had developed the design of the handheld Curta mechanical calculator. It was simple to use and, being digital, was completely accurate. Because of these advantages and despite its somewhat higher price its total sales were 150,000 – over ten times more than the Fuller. Its range of mathematical calculations was seen as being adequate. However, for scientific calculations the Fuller remained viable until 1973 when, along with the Curta, it was made obsolete by the Hewlett-Packard HP-35 handheld scientific electronic calculator.

Invention, sales and demise

The calculator was invented by George Fuller (1829–1907), professor of engineering at Queen's University Belfast (Queen's College at that time). He patented it in Britain in 1878, described it in Nature in 1879 and in that year he also patented it the United States, depositing a patent model.

Fuller's calculators were manufactured by the scientific instrument maker W.F. Stanley & Co. of London who made nearly 14,000 between 1878 and 1973.

In Britain the prices charged by W.F. Stanley in 1900 were for model 1 £3 and for model 3 £4 10s. The Whythe-Fuller model was advertised in a 1962 W.F. Stanley catalogue at £21 (£ in ). The calculator was still listed in Stanley's catalogue in 1976 when model 1 cost £60 (£ in ) and model 2 was £61.25.

In the United States the instrument was marketed by Keuffel and Esser who only supplied model 1. They described it as "Fuller's Spiral Slide Rule" and, over the period it was sold between 1895 and 1927, it rose in price from $28 to $42 (falling from $ to $ in  prices).

From the time when serial numbers were first stamped (about 1900) to when production ceased in 1973 around 14,000 instruments were made. Production was about 180 per year overall but it declined after about 1955. In 1949 Encyclopædia Britannica, noting that the Fuller had been designed in 1878, reported that it "has been in considerable use up to the present time".

In 1958 the mathematician and physicist Douglas Hartree wrote that the Fuller "... is cheap compared with a desk machine and may be found very useful in work for which its accuracy is adequate and in circumstances in which the cost of a desk machine is prohibitive. [...] With one of these slide-rules and an adding machine much useful numerical work can be done ...". In 1968 the standard Fuller cost about $50 at a time when an electronic Hewlett-Packard HP 9100A desktop calculator (weighing ) cost just under $5000.
But in 1972 Hewlett-Packard introduced the HP-35, the first handheld calculator with scientific functions, at $395 – the Fuller went out of production the next year.

Operation

Multiplication and division

The instrument operates on the principle that two pointers are set at an appropriate separation on the helical scale of the calculator. The relevant numbers are indexed by adjusting separately both the movable cylinder and the movable pointer. Since the scale is logarithmic the separation represents the ratio of the numbers. If the cylinder is then moved without altering the positions of the pointers, this same ratio applies between any other pair of numbers addressed. In other words, it is a logarithmic Gunter's scale wound into a helix with Gunter's compass points being provided by pointers A and B.

To multiply two numbers, p and q, cylinder C is rotated and shifted until pointer A points to p and pointer B is then moved so B1 points to 100. Next, cylinder C is moved so B1 points to q. The product is then read from the pointer A. The decimal point is determined as with an ordinary slide rule. At the end of a calculation the slide rule is already positioned to continue with further multiplications.

To divide p by q, cylinder C is rotated and shifted until pointer A points to p, B1 is brought to q, cylinder C is moved to bring 100 to B1 and the quotient is read from pointer A. It turns out to be particularly efficient to alternate multiplication with division.

Determining logarithms
The scales are linear and one is engraved along the length of pointer B and the other printed around the circumference of the top of cylinder C. Index B1 is set to the relevant value on cylinder C and then two readings are taken. The first reading is from the scale on pointer B where it crosses the topmost spiral of the helical scale on the cylinder. The second reading is from the scale at the top circumference of cylinder C where it crosses the left edge of pointer B. The sum of the readings provides the mantissa of the log of the value.

Trigonometry and log functions
 
For model 2 instruments with scales on the inner cylinder D, there is an index mark inscribed on both the top and bottom edges of cylinder C. As an example of use, when the lower index mark is set to an angle printed on the lower scale on cylinder D, pointer A points to the corresponding value of sine on cylinder C. The same approach apples for the log scale on the upper part of cylinder D. The model 3 Fuller–Bakewell is used in the same way but its scales on cylinder D are for cosine² and sinecosine(see photograph).

Notes

References

Citations

Works cited
 – author granted permission to display on website.

 updated at

Further reading

 – description of Model 1

  Fuller calculator instructional video

Mechanical calculators
Analog computers
Northern Irish inventions